Maculagonum is a genus of ground beetles in the family Carabidae. There are at least 20 described species in Maculagonum, found in Indonesia and Papua New Guinea.

Species
These 20 species belong to the genus Maculagonum:

 Maculagonum altipox Darlington, 1952
 Maculagonum atropox Darlington, 1971
 Maculagonum canipox Darlington, 1971
 Maculagonum coeruleipenne Baehr, 2018
 Maculagonum daymanpox Darlington, 1971
 Maculagonum depilapox Darlington, 1971
 Maculagonum giluwe Baehr, 2018
 Maculagonum kaindipox Darlington, 1971
 Maculagonum loebli Baehr, 2018
 Maculagonum oculare Baehr, 2018
 Maculagonum opacipenne Baehr, 2018
 Maculagonum plagipox Darlington, 1952
 Maculagonum pox Darlington, 1952
 Maculagonum quadrimaculatum Baehr, 2018
 Maculagonum riedeli Baehr, 2018
 Maculagonum scaphipox Darlington, 1952
 Maculagonum seripox Darlington, 1971
 Maculagonum setipox Darlington, 1952
 Maculagonum tafapox Darlington, 1952
 Maculagonum waupox Darlington, 1971

References

Platyninae